The Angra do Heroísmo Football Association is one of the 22 District Football Associations that are affiliated with the Portuguese Football Federation. The AF Angra do Heroísmo administers lower-tier football in the municipalities on the islands of Terceira, São Jorge, and Graciosa, within the Portuguese archipelago of the Azores.

Background 
The association, commonly abbreviated as the AF Angra do Heroísmo, is the governing body for football in the former Portuguese district of Angra do Heroísmo. Established in 1921, the Association, which is seated in the municipality of Angra do Heroísmo, on the island of Terceira, regulates football in the three Azorean islands of Terceira, São Jorge, and Graciosa.

Competitions
Clubs within the Association compete in two of the three levels of the national Portuguese football league in competitions run by the Portuguese Football Federation (Campeonato Nacional de Seniores). In 2013-14, the highest ranked club was Sport Clube Praiense which competed in the Campeonato Nacional de Seniores (the third-tier of the league system).

Below the Campeonato Nacional de Seniores the competitions are organised by districts (known in Portuguese as Distritais) with each District Association organising its competitions according to geography and other factors. Consequently, the AF Angra do Heroísmo runs three island championships for the islands of Terceira, São Jorge, and Graciosa.

In addition, the AF Angra do Heroísmo organizes District Championships for football and Futsal for men and women for all age groups including Senior, Junior, Youth, Beginners, Infants and Schools.

Notable clubs affiliated to AF Angra do Heroísmo

Primeira Liga (tier 1)
 None

Liga de Honra (tier 2)
 None

Campeonato Nacional de Seniores (tier 3)
 Sport Clube Praiense

Distritais (tier 4)
 Sporting Clube de Guadalupe
 Sport Clube Lusitânia
 Sport Clube Angrense

Current Divisions - 2011–12 Season
The AF Angra do Heroísmo run the following three island championships covering the fourth tier of the Portuguese football league system.

Ilha Graciosa
Graciosa Futebol Clube
Grupo Desportivo Luzense
Sport Clube Marítimo (Graciosa)

Ilha São Jorge
Futebol Clube da Calheta
Futebol Clube Marítimo Velense
Futebol Clube Urzelinense
Grupo Desportivo Velense

Ilha Terceira
Boavista Clube da Ribeirinha
Grupo Desportivo das Fontinhas
Juventude Desportiva Lajense
Os Marítimos de São Mateus Sport Clube
Sport Clube Barreiro
Sport Clube Vilanovense

Former participants
Other clubs that have competed in the Distritais since the 1992/93 season include:

Ilha Graciosa
Grupo Desportivo Mocidade Praiense

Ilha São Jorge
Grupo Desportivo Beira
Grupo Desportivo Topo

Ilha Terceira
Carioca Futebol Club
Clube Desportivo de Belém
Clube Desportivo Praia
Grupo Desportivo Casa Povo 4 Ribeiras
Grupo Desportivo Recreativo Agualva
Sport Clube Barbarense
Sporting Clube Os Leões
União Desportiva Praiense
União Sebastianense Futebol Clube

List of member clubs

Footnote
 1-10 games in Portuguese Cup.     *
 11-100 games in Portuguese Cup.  * *
 101+ games in Portuguese Cup.     * * *

References

See also
 Portuguese District Football Associations
 Portuguese football competitions
 List of football clubs in Portugal

Angra do Heroismo
Football in the Azores
Organisations based in the Azores
Sports organizations established in 1921